Kerry Burke is an Australian former rugby league footballer who played in the 1960s and 1970s.

Playing career
A Parramatta junior, Burke was graded at Parramatta in 1963 and was playing first grade the following year. He played with Parramatta until the end of 1968, and joined South Sydney the following year. 

Burke played centre in the unsuccessful Souths team that played in the 1969 Grand Final. Burke lost his permanent position in first grade to the emerging young player, Paul Sait in 1970. 

Burke appeared in South Sydney first grade teams until his retirement at the end of the 1972 NSWRFL season.

References

South Sydney Rabbitohs players
Parramatta Eels players
Australian rugby league players
Living people
Rugby league centres
Year of birth missing (living people)
Place of birth missing (living people)